Sirsa Air Force Station or Sirsa AFS (ICAO: VISX) is an Indian Air Force base under  Western Air Command, located at Sirsa in the state of Haryana, India.

History

1971 Indo-Pak war
In Indo-Pakistani War of 1971, Pakistan Air Force launched a pre-emptive raid on 12 airforce stations, including Sirsa station, Faridkot Stations, Halwara Air Force Station, a few railway stations, Indian armour concentrations and other targets. However, this failed to cause any significant damage except pothole damage to the runway which was quickly repaired. Dassault Mystère IV jets from Sirsa base pounded the Pakistan Army pitched against the Indian Army in the Battle of Sabuna Drain. Dassault Mystère also hit a train and destroyed 50 tanks on it between Okara and Sahiwal.

Units
It has No. 21 Squadron IAF of 45 Wing. Wing is an active air force combat formation. No. 15 Squadron IAF operating Su-30MKI is also based here.

Originally the base was home to a squadron each of MiG-23s and MiG-27s, both single-engine fighters, of No. 21 Squadron IAF.

See also

 Airports Authority of India
 Ambala Air Force Station
 Gurugram Air Force Station
 Hisar Military Station
 List of Armed Forces Hospitals In India
 List of highways in Haryana
 List of Indian Air Force bases
 Railway in Haryana
 Raja Nahar Singh Faridabad Air Force Logistics Station

References

External links 
 Video of the Surya Kiran Aerobatics Team (SKAT) during the Air Show at Sirsa Air Force Station.

Indian Air Force bases
Airports in Haryana
Sirsa district
Airports established in 1964
1964 establishments in East Punjab
20th-century architecture in India